A hero stone (Vīragallu in Kannada, Naṭukal in Tamil) is a memorial commemorating the honorable death of a hero in battle. Erected between the second half of the first millennium BCE and the 18th century CE, hero stones are found all over India. They often carry inscriptions and a variety of ornaments, including bas relief panels, frieze, and figures in carved stone. Usually they are in the form of a stone monument and may have an inscription at the bottom with a narrative of the battle. The earliest and oldest of such memorial Hero stones is found in the Indian state of Tamil Nadu is more than 2400 years old that is 4th Century BCE. According to the historian Upinder Singh, the largest concentration of such memorial stones is found in the Indian state of Karnataka. About two thousand six hundred and fifty hero stones, the earliest in Karnataka is dated to the 5th century CE. The custom of erecting memorial stones dates back to the Iron Age (400 BCE) though a vast majority were erected between the 4th century BCE to 13th centuries CE.

Description

A hero stone was usually divided into three panels, but occasionally, into four or five panels depending on the event. The upper panel depicts the subject worshiping a deity such as a Shiva linga, vishnu, gaja lakshmi or jain tirthankara, the middle panel depicts the hero sometimes seated in a palanquin or a shrine being lifted toward the heavens by apsaras (heavenly nymphs), and the lower panels would display battle scenes. One of the largest Viragallu, about 12 feet high is found in Betageri, Karnataka. In Tamil Nadu, Department of Archeology found several hundred hero stones that had been erected in the memory of warriors who sacrificed their lives defending their community or region. Those that are carved with inscriptions narrate the act of the hero, the battle, and the name of king who fought the battle. The stones are found alone or in groups, often near an irrigation tank or lake outside a village. One hero stone dating to the 9th century Pallava King Dantivarman, depicts the hero riding a galloping horse beautifully dressed and carrying a spear.  Another was recovered at Pappapatti in Usilampatti taluk and probably dates from the 18th century. This stone shows a warrior posed heroically, accompanied by his wife who holds a flower. Creating hero stones had been prevalent since the Sangam period dating back 2300 years, and continuing until the Nayaka and post-Nayaka period to about 19th century. In March 2014, a hero stone dating to the 8th century Pandya country, with an inscription in Tamil vatteluttu script was found in Vellalankottai in the Tuticorin district. and another that was installed by a woman in memory of her husband who killed a leopard preying on cattle that strayed into the hamlet. In 2017, two rare hero stones raised in honour of warrior-women riding to a battle were found, dating back 13th century.

Hero stones were not always made in honour of a person. The Atakur inscription (also spelt Athakur) is one such hero stone. It is dated to 939 CE and includes classical Kannada poetic inscription commemorating the death of the favourite hound of Ganga King Butuga II (the hound died fighting a wild boar).

Gallery

See also

 Paliya

Notes

References

External links

 Hero Stones
 
Hero-stone Memorials of India
Rare Hero stone found near Erode

Government Museum Chennai
Huntington Archive Hero Stone
Ancient Hero stone goes missing in Goa

Monuments and memorials in India
Inscriptions by type
Monuments and memorials in Karnataka